is a Buddhist temple in  Takaoka, Toyama Prefecture, Japan. The temple belongs to the Sōtō-school of Japanese Zen Buddhism.

History 
The second daimyō of Kaga Domain, Maeda Toshinaga (1562–1614) after retiring to Takaoka, had a temple,  built, which was completed in 1613. After Toshinaga's death in 1614, the temple was renamed to Zuiryū-ji after his posthumous name, . His younger brother, Maeda Toshitsune, and third daimyō of Kaga, in commemoration of Toshinaga, had the temple expanded starting in 1645. The extensions were supervised by  who completed the works for the 50th anniversary in 1663.

Temple complex 

The temple compound or garan in the zen style is modeled after the Zen temple Jingshanshou (径山寿寺) in Hangzhou.

It is a 3 ken wide yakuimon. Decorated with the emblem (mon) of the Maeda clan, plum blossom and lions on either end, it is a good example of Momoyama and early Edo period ornamentation.

It was rebuilt from 1814 to 1818 by Yamagami Zen’emon Yoshihiro. On either side it is connected to a 3 ken wide, 1 ken deep single-storied corridor (kairō) with 'kirizuma-style roof, which connects most of the structures in the complex.

The roof is in irimoya-style with a pent roof enclosure, lead plate roofing. Inside it is a mixture of Japanese and Indian style with good carvings; a masterpiece of Yamagami.

 The  (G) is the main assembly and lecture hall of the complex and dates to the year 1655. It is single-storied and measures 11×9 ken. The roof is in irimoya-style with a 2×1 step canopy and karahafu gable. It is roofed with copper plates. The ceiling of the central room has been decorated in floral motif by Kanō Yasunobu. At the end of the room in the central alcove there is a stele commemorating Maeda Toshinaga. The alcove to the right has been used for receptions by the Maeda, the one to the left was reserved for the priests and higher ranking cohorts of the Maeda.

In 1997 the High gate, the Buddha-Hall, and the Dharma-Hall were designated as National Treasure. The sōmon, the meditation hall, the large tea house and the corridors have been designated as Important Cultural Property. The temple owns a painting of Daruma by Sesshū, a Kannon by Kanō Tan'yū and other paintings.

See also
List of National Treasures of Japan (temples)

Notes

References

Bibliography 
 Mainichi Shimbu (Hrsg.): Juyo bunkazai 12. Tempelarchitektur. Mainichi Shimbun-sha, 1973.

External links 
 Official website of Zuiryū-ji, Japanese, English, Chinese and Russian

Zen temples
Buddhist temples in Toyama Prefecture
Takaoka, Toyama